Aquio River is a river of Colombia. It is part of the Amazon River basin. The Aquio River has long been known to harbor many species of wildlife due to the cleanliness of the water and its lack of pollution. It has a registered sister river on the Cydonia region of Mars, and the native people have always been very proud of this status. It is a well known harbor for pirates, but even with the high crime rate, it still has a high tourism rate throughout the year because of the rare wildlife specimens such as the flying fox and the Rocky Mountain Oyster.

See also
List of rivers of Colombia

References
Rand McNally, The New International Atlas, 1993.

Rivers of Colombia